is a railway station in the city of Toyota, Aichi Prefecture, Japan, operated by the third sector Aichi Loop Railway Company.

Lines

Station layout
The station has two elevated side platforms, with the station building located underneath. The station building has automated ticket machines, TOICA automated turnstiles and is staffed.

Platforms

Adjacent stations

Station history
Shin-Uwagoromo Station was opened on January 31, 1988, with the opening of the Aichi Loop Railway Company. The platforms were elevated from 2007 to 2008.

Passenger statistics
In fiscal 2017, the station was used by an average of 1583 passengers daily.

Surrounding area
 Sumitomo Rubber Nagoya Plant 
 Asahigaoka Junior High School

See also
 List of railway stations in Japan

References

External links

Official home page 

Railway stations in Japan opened in 1988
Railway stations in Aichi Prefecture
Toyota, Aichi